The 1997/98 FIS Ski Jumping Continental Cup was the 7th in a row (5th official) Continental Cup winter season in ski jumping for men. 

Other competitive circuits this season included the World Cup and Grand Prix.

Calendar

Men

Standings

Men

Europa Cup vs. Continental Cup 
This was originally last Europa Cup season and is also recognized as the first Continental Cup season by International Ski Federation although under this name began its first official season in 1993/94.

References

FIS Ski Jumping Continental Cup
1997 in ski jumping
1998 in ski jumping